The Central African Republic made its Paralympic Games début at the 2004 Summer Paralympics in Athens. It sent a single athlete, Thibaut Bomaya, to compete in powerlifting. The country also entered a single-man delegation at the 2008 Summer Paralympics in Beijing, where Rosel-Clemariot-Christian Nikoua competed in shot put. The Central African Republic has never taken part in the Winter Paralympics, and has never won a Paralympic medal.

The Central African Republic will be taking part in the 2012 Summer Paralympics, and the Comité National Paralympique Centrafricain have chosen Bedford as the UK training base for its Paralympians.

Medal tables

Medals by Summer Games

Full results for the Central African Republic at the Paralympics

See also
 Central African Republic at the Olympics

References